Chekfa is a district in Jijel Province, Algeria. It was named after its capital, Chekfa.

Municipalities
The district is further divided into 4 municipalities:
Chekfa
El Kennar Nouchfi
Sidi Abdelaziz
Bordj T'har

 
Jijel Province